The White Nights Festival is an annual summer festival in Saint Petersburg celebrating its near-midnight sun phenomena due to its location near the Arctic Circle; each year between around April 22 and August 21, the skies only reach twilight and never reach complete darkness. Organized by the Saint Petersburg City Administration, the festival begins on June 11 with the "Stars of the White Nights" at Mariinsky Theatre and ends on July 1. However, some performances connected to the festival take place before and after the official dates.

Numerous night-time cultural festivals, also called White Nights, have been inspired by this.

No festival has been held since 2020.

Highlights of the White Nights Festival

Classical ballet, opera, music at the White Nights Festival
The "Stars of the White Nights" (Music festival "Stars of the White Nights") is a series of classical ballet, opera, and orchestral performances at the Mariinsky Theatre and the Mariinsky Concert Hall, as the essential part of the White Nights Festival in St. Petersburg. The artistic director of the festival is Valery Gergiev. During the festival, there are daily evening performances at the Mariinsky Theatre (either ballet or opera) and almost daily evening performances at the Mariinsky Concert Hall (either classical concert or opera-in-concert). Usually evening performances start at 7 pm, but sometimes may also start at 6 pm or 8 pm. In addition, sometimes there are morning or daytime performances as well, that can start either at 12 noon, or at 2 pm or at 4 pm.

The "Stars of the White Nights" festival was originally started by the first mayor of St. Petersburg, Anatoly Sobchak, and has been held annually since 1993. Some of the stars who performed here include Plácido Domingo, Olga Borodina, Alfred Brendel, Anna Netrebko, Carlo Maria Giulini, Yuri Temirkanov, Gidon Kremer, Esa-Pekka Salonen, Alexander Toradze, Deborah Voigt, James Conlon and many other classical performers.

The "Stars of the White Nights Festival" runs from May through July (usually from the last week of May till the 2nd half of July) at the Mariinsky Theatre and the newly built Mariinsky Concert Hall - one of the best-sounding halls in the world.  For 2008, expect world-class performances by Valery Gergiev, Christoph Eschenbach, Alfred Brendel, Maxim Vengerov, Maria Guleghina, Bryn Terfel and Thomas Hampson, not to mention the ultimate Mariinsky ballerinas Ulyana Lopatkina and Diana Vishneva.

Because of the high demand, usually tickets are sold out several weeks or even months before the performance date.

Scarlet Sails celebration

The Scarlet Sails celebration in St. Petersburg is the most famous public event during the White Nights, known in Russian as "Alye Parusa" festivity. The event is highly popular for spectacular fireworks and a massive show celebrating the end of the school year: "Scarlet Sails" celebration in St. Petersburg

This tradition began here after the end of World War II, when schools united to celebrate the ending of a school year in connection with symbolism of the popular children's book "Scarlet Sails" by Alexander Grin. At that time a boat with scarlet sails was sailing along the English Embankment and the Admiralty Embankment towards the Winter Palace. Although it was designed to update the rusty revolutionary propaganda, the "Scarlet Sails" tradition has become a popular public event, annually celebrating the ending of the school year in June. The "Scarlet sails" appearance is now the most popular part of the White Nights celebration.

The popularity of both the book and the tradition was boosted after the 1961 release of the movie titled "Alye parusa" ("Scarlet sails" in English), starring Anastasiya Vertinskaya and Vasily Lanovoy.

Carnivals of the White Nights
A series of carnivals take place during the White Nights Festival in St. Petersburg. The largest and most internationally renowned carnival takes place in the Peterhof suburb of St. Petersburg. There actors dressed in period costumes from the times of Peter the Great and Catherine the Great give performances reproducing some of the historic events of that period. Period carriages are ridden around the Peterhof park as part of the carnival.

Carnivals at the Catherine Palace and in the Pavlovsk suburb of St. Petersburg are renowned for their highly artistic reproduction of the historic events that took place at those palaces. Period carriages are driven around the Catherine park as part of the carnival entertainment.

The Palace Square in St. Petersburg serves as a natural stage for numerous carnival events and appearances showing period costumes of the Tsars and Tsarinas.

Star performances at the Palace Square
Every summer in St. Petersburg the Palace Square becomes a stage for international stars of popular music. This wide square has been used for official military parades and massive demonstrations, as well as for political events and large-scale shows and other entertainment. The most recent appearances were those of Paul McCartney, The Rolling Stones, Scorpions and other stars.

Star appearances are usually connected with the White Nights, though some appearances may not coincide with the time of the White Nights Festival because of individual schedules or other reasons (such as the postponement of The Rolling Stones' appearance in 2006 owing to the temporary disability of Keith Richards). In July 2007, they played their show in front of the Tsar's Winter Palace before a crowd of 50 thousand Russian fans.

Marathon
From 1990 to 2019 and resuming in 2023, the festival has included the White Nights International Marathon and 10K run through the streets of St. Petersburg. More than 5,000 runners take part each year.

White Nights Festival in the media
Several film festivals take place around the time of the White Nights Festival.

During the entire season of the White Nights the St. Petersburg news media, newspapers and television are focused on the White Nights Festival, showcasing its numerous events

References

External links
Official website

Photos and videos
"Scarlet Sails" celebration: "Scarlet Sails" celebration in St. Petersburg

Entertainment in Saint Petersburg
Festivals in Saint Petersburg
Tourist attractions in Saint Petersburg
Annual events in Russia